Taboo is a 2015 Iranian Drama film written and directed by Khosro Masoumi.

Plot 
Taboo is the story of a 67-year-old Iranian landowner named Salar (Jamal Ejlali) in the north of Iran. In spite of having 3 legal wives, he is pushing one of his workers - who has a beautiful 24-year-old daughter (Elnaz Shakerdoost), to force his daughter into marrying him. The girl is a nurse and is in love with a local teacher  named Kasra (Mohammad Hadi Dibaji). She escapes to him and together they decide to get marry but...

Cast 
 Elnaz Shakerdoost
 Mohammad Hadi Dibaji
 Elham Nami
 Mehran Rajabi
 Jamal Ejlali 
 Roshanak Gerami
 Hossein Abedini
 Jamshid Jahanzadeh
 Khayam Vaghar Kashani
 Nouraldin Aalami
 Bijan Afshar
 Mitra Tabrizi
 Oliver Raymond Maule

Awards and nominations

References

External links

2015 films
2010s Persian-language films
Iranian drama films
2015 drama films